Ao Changrong (born 1 March 1983 in Morin Dawa Daur Autonomous Banner, Inner Mongolia)  is a Chinese professional field hockey player who represented China at the 2008 Summer Olympics in Beijing. The team finished last in their group, and finished 11th after beating South Africa.

References

External links
 
 
 

1983 births
Living people
Chinese male field hockey players
Olympic field hockey players of China
Field hockey players at the 2008 Summer Olympics
People from Hulunbuir
Sportspeople from Inner Mongolia